The Intel Cache Acceleration Software (CAS) is a computer data storage product for solid-state drive (SSD) caching.

Description
CAS manages using the SSD storage as a cache layer for slower storage data (e.g. spinning hard drives). A cached copy of recently used data from slower storage is kept in faster SSD storage to improve I/O performance. CAS entered Intel's product line as the result of Intel's August 2012 acquisition of a Canadian start-up company Nevex Virtual Technologies; Intel re-branded Nevex CacheWorks product to CAS with the release of version 2.0 in December 2012. Versions of Intel CAS are available for Windows Enterprise, Windows Workstation, and Linux.

CAS for Windows is an application-aware file-based cache, which can be tuned by system administrators. Additionally, it integrates with the operating system's buffer cache, creating a multi-tier cache architecture. CAS is also aware of some virtualization technologies like vMotion, maintaining a hot SSD cache during a VM migration.

CAS works with the enterprise-class Intel SSD products, such as the DC S3700 SATA drives and the DC P3700 NVMe PCI Express devices. It also works with cache devices across SANs.  Intel CAS for Linux consists of a GPL'd source loadable kernel module paired with a closed source user-space admin configuration tool. The CAS for Linux version supports CentOS, Red Hat Enterprise Linux and SUSE Linux Enterprise Server. The Windows Enterprise version currently runs only on the 64-bit flavors of Windows Server 2008 R2 SP1 and Windows Server 2012 R2; 32-bit versions are not currently supported. The Windows Workstation version currently runs on only the 64-bit flavors of Windows 7, Windows 8.1, and Windows 10; 32-bit versions are not currently supported.

The current version of CAS for Linux supports write-through, write-back, and write-around caching. The Windows versions of CAS support write-through and write-back caching.

A workstation version, called CAS-W, was announced in September 2013 by Dell; Dell's announcement states an exclusive agreement with Intel to offer CAS-W only for Dell Precision workstations.

Operating System and File System Support

Intel CAS for Linux

Intel CAS for Windows Enterprise

Intel CAS for Windows Workstation

See also
Intel Smart Response Technology for desktop-class computers
Microsoft's Automated Tiering (Windows 2012 R2)

References

External links 

Open CAS Framework
Old blog post on the (now defunct) Nevex web site explaining the basic idea behind CacheWorks

Solid-state caching
Intel acquisitions
Intel products